Ismael Mosqueira (1911 – 30 July 1966) was a Mexican gymnast. He competed in two events at the 1932 Summer Olympics. At the 1946 Central American and Caribbean Games, Mosqueira won gold, silver and bronze, in the horizontal bar, team event and pommel horse respectively.

References

External links
 

1911 births
1966 deaths
Mexican male artistic gymnasts
Olympic gymnasts of Mexico
Gymnasts at the 1932 Summer Olympics
Sportspeople from Mexico City
20th-century Mexican people